Ischnoglossa prolixa is a species of rove beetles native to Europe.

References

Staphylinidae
Beetles described in 1802
Beetles of Europe